The 35th AVN Awards, presented by Adult Video News (AVN), honored the best pornographic movies and adult entertainment products of between October 1, 2016, and September 30, 2017, and took place on January 27, 2018 at The Joint in Hard Rock Hotel and Casino, Paradise, Nevada. During the ceremony, Adult Video News presented AVN Awards (often referred to as the Oscars of porn) in more than 100 categories. Webcam star Harli Lotts and performer/director Angela White co-hosted the ceremony, each for the first time. Master of ceremonies was comedian Aries Spears.

The show was webcast live on AVN.com originating from Livestream.com. This year also marked the return of GayVN Awards after extended hiatus held at same location a week before AVN awards; both being part of AVN Adult Entertainment Expo also known as AVN Week.

Best Drama winner Half His Age: A Teenage Tragedy earned honors as Best Movie. However, Justice League XXX: An Axel Braun Parody and Angela 3 each won six awards, tied for the most honors at the show. Movie of the Year winner Half His Age: A Teenage Tragedy took four trophies.

Winners and nominees 
The nominees for the 35th AVN Awards were announced on November 16, 2017, at the annual AVN Awards Nominations Party at The Edison lounge in downtown Los Angeles.| 

The winners were announced during the awards ceremony on January 27, 2018.

The major performer awards went to Angela White, AVN Female Performer of the Year Award; Markus Dupree, Male Performer of the Year and Jill Kassidy, Best New Starlet. In terms of movies, the big winners were Justice League XXX: An Axel Braun Parody and Angela 3, each with six awards.

Major awards 

Winners of categories announced during the awards ceremony January 27, 2018, are highlighted in boldface and indicated with a double dagger.

Additional award winners 
The following is the list of remaining award categories, which were presented apart from the actual awards ceremony.

CONTENT CATEGORIES
 All-Girl Performer of the Year: Jenna Sativa
 Best All-Girl Group Sex Scene: Melissa Moore, Elsa Jean, Adria Rae Best New Starlets 2017
 Best All-Girl Movie: Angela Loves Women 3
 Best All-Girl Series: Women Seeking Women
 Best Amateur/Pro-Am Movie: Amateur Introductions 24
 Best Anal Movie: Anal Savages 3
 Best Anal Series: Anal Savages
 Best Anthology Movie: Sacrosanct
 Best Art Direction: Justice League XXX: An Axel Braun Parody
 Best BDSM Movie: Cybill Troy Is Vicious
 Best Cinematography: Winston Henry, Sacrosanct 
 Best Continuing Series: Angela Loves ...
 Best Director – Feature: Axel Braun, Justice League XXX: An Axel Braun Parody
 Best Director – Foreign Feature: Hervé Bodilis, Pascal Lucas, Revenge of a Daughter
 Best Director – Foreign Non-Feature: Hervé Bodilis, Megan Escort Deluxe 
 Best Director – Non-Feature: Kayden Kross, Sacrosanct
 Best Double-Penetration Sex Scene: Angela White, Markus Dupree, Mick Blue, Angela 3 
 Best Editing: Angela White, Angela 3 
 Best Ethnic Movie: Asian Anal
 Best Ethnic/Interracial Series: Black & White
 Best Foreign Feature: Bulldogs
 Best Foreign Non-Feature: Anissa the Tenniswoman
 Best Foreign Series: Rocco’s Psycho Teens
 Best Gonzo Movie: Manuel’s Fucking POV 7
 Best Group Sex Scene: Angela White, Mick Blue, Xander Corvus, Markus Dupree, Toni Ribas, John Strong, Angela 3
 Best Ingénue Movie: Young Fantasies 2
 Best Interracial Movie: Interracial Icon 4
 Best Lewd Propositions Movie: Babysitter Auditions
 Best Makeup: Dusty, May Kup, Cammy Ellis, Justice League XXX: An Axel Braun Parody
 Best Male Newcomer: Wes Meadows (Vacated; Given to Juan “El Caballo” Loco)
 Best Marketing Campaign – Individual Project: Justice League XXX: An Axel Braun Parody
 Best Marketing Campaign – Company Image: Vixen
 Best MILF Movie: MILF Performers of the Year 2017
 Best New Imprint: Pure Taboo
 Best New Series: Young & Beautiful
 Best Niche Movie: Cum Inside Me 3
 Best Niche Series: Squirt for Me
 Best Non-Sex Performance: Kyle Stone, Conflicted
 Best Older Woman/Younger Girl Movie: The Art of Older Women
 Best Oral Movie: Facialized 4
 Best Orgy/Gangbang Movie: My First Gangbang
 Best Parody: Justice League XXX: An Axel Braun Parody
 Best Polyamory Movie: Adventures With the Baumgartners
 Best Screenplay: Will Ryder, Bad Babes Inc.
 Best Sex Scene in a Foreign-Shot Production: Claire Castel, Kristof Cale, Math, Ricky Mancini; Claire Desires of Submission
 Best Solo/Tease Performance: Angela White, Angela 3
 Best Soundtrack: The Altar of Aphrodite
 Best Special Effects: Justice League XXX: An Axel Braun Parody

Content (ctd.)

 Best Supporting Actor: Small Hands, Half His Age: A Teenage Tragedy
 Best Taboo Relations Movie: Dysfucktional: Blood Is Thicker Than Cum
 Best Three-Way Sex Scene – Boy/Boy/Girl: Kendra Sunderland, Jason Brown, Ricky Johnson; Kendra’s Obsession
 Best Three-Way Sex Scene – Girl/Girl/Boy: Riley Reid, Megan Rain, Mick Blue; Young & Beautiful
 Best Transsexual Movie: All My Mother’s Lovers, Buck Angel Superstar (tie)
 Best Transsexual Series: Hot for Transsexuals
 Best Transsexual Sex Scene: Adriana Chechik, Aubrey Kate, Adriana Chechik Is the Squirt Queen 
 Best Virtual Reality Product/Site: BadoinkVR.com
 Best Virtual Reality Sex Scene: Adriana Chechik, Megan Rain, Arya Fae, Tommy Gunn; "Zombie Slayers", WankzVR.com
 Best Web Director: Mike Adriano
 Clever Title of the Year: Black Loads Matter
 Female Foreign Performer of the Year: Jasmine Jae
 Mainstream Star of the Year: Asa Akira
 Male Foreign Performer of the Year: Ryan Ryder
 MILF Performer of the Year: Cherie DeVille
 Most Outrageous Sex Scene: Leya Falcon, Ophelia Rain in “Well There’s ONE Place You Can Put an AVN Award”, Viking Girls Gone Horny
 Niche Performer of the Year: Cybill Troy

PLEASURE PRODUCTS
 Best Condom Manufacturer: Paradise Lubricated Condom
 Best Enhancement Manufacturer: Bedroom Products
 Best Fetish Manufacturer: XR Brands
 Best Lingerie or Apparel Manufacturer: Fantasy Lingerie
 Best Lubricant Manufacturer: Wicked Sensual Care
 Best Pleasure Product Manufacturer – Small: Clandestine Devices
 Best Pleasure Product Manufacturer – Medium: We-Vibe
 Best Pleasure Product Manufacturer – Large: Topco Sales

RETAIL & DISTRIBUTION
 Best Boutique: Pepper's Parties Too (Hattiesburg, MS)
 Best Retail Chain – Small: Inz & Outz
 Best Retail Chain – Medium: The Pleasure Chest
 Best Retail Chain – Large: Castle Megastore
 Best Web Retail Store: AdultEmpire.com

FAN AWARDS
 Favorite BBW Performer: Angelina Castro
 Favorite Cam Guy: Aamir Desire
 Favorite Camming Couple: 19honeysuckle (aka Honey & Tom Christian)
 Favorite Female Porn Star: Angela White
 Favorite Indie Clip Star: Jenny Blighe
 Favorite Membership Site: BrazzersNetwork.com
 Favorite Male Porn Star: Johnny Sins
 Favorite Porn Star Website: Angela White
 Favorite Trans Cam Star: Aubrey Kate
 Favorite Trans Porn Star: Chanel Santini
 Hottest MILF: Kendra Lust
 Hottest Newcomer: Lena Paul
 Most Amazing Sex Toy: Angela White Fleshlight
 Most Epic Ass: Alexis Texas
 Most Spectacular Boobs: Angela White
 Social Media Star: Riley Reid

Multiple nominations and awards 

Justice League XXX: An Axel Braun Parody and Angela 3, each with six, were the movies that won the most awards. Half His Age: A Teenage Tragedy was next with four trophies while Sacrosanct won three. Facialized 4 and Anal Savages 3 won two apiece while the Anal Savages series also won a best series award. Angela Loves Women 3 also won an award in addition to being part of the Angela Loves... series, which also won a best series award.

Justice League XXX: An Axel Braun Parody also had the most nominations, with 13.

AVN Honorary Awards

Hall of Fame 

AVN on January 6, 2018, announced the 2017 inductees into its hall of fame, who were later honored with a January 23 cocktail party and then a video as the awards show opened.

 Video Branch: Alexis Amore, Eva Angelina, William H., Brandon Iron, Jessica Jaymes, Sunny Leone, Nick Orleans, Kirsten Price, Mike Ranger, David Stanley, Celeste Star, Aiden Starr, Devlin Weed, Angela White, Michael Zen
 Executive Branch: Marc Bruder, Mara Epstein, Rondee Kamins
 Founders Branch: Mark Kulkis, David Joseph, Chuck Zane
 Internet Founders Branch: Brad Mitchell

Presenters and performers 
AVN announced the 2018 AVN Awards Trophy Girls would be Ayumi Anime and Sofi Ryan.

Hip-hop artist Lil Wayne performed several musical numbers during the show. Comedian and master of ceremonies Aries Spears cracked jokes and appeared in several comedy skits with various adult industry luminaries.

Ceremony information 

For the first time, content released exclusively on membership websites was eligible for AVN Awards consideration in any sex scene category. AVN also added two new categories in the Web and Technology area: Best New Website and Best Clip Website. In addition, Best Specialty Movie - Other Genre and Best Specialty Series - Other Genre were renamed Best Niche Movie and Series and a new category, Niche Performer of the Year, was added. At the nominations unveiling, two more new categories, Best Action/Thriller and Best Lewd Propositions Movie were announced. Favorite BBW Performer was added later as a fan-voted category for 2018. Another new fan category for 2018 was Favorite Cosplay Cam Cosplayer.

Porn legend Ron Jeremy was banned from the year's awards show. AVN felt he violated its code of conduct based on a Rolling Stone article published in November 2017, in which he was accused of sexual misconduct.

In Memoriam
As the show was beginning, AVN used a video segment to pay a tribute to adult-industry personalities who had died since the 2017 awards show: James Baes, Sean Barnett, Ron Harris, Hugh Hefner, Morton Hyatt, Sonny Landham, Radley Metzger, Jocalyn Pink, January Seraph, Greg Steel, Michael Zen, Roxy Nicole, Olivia Nova, Olivia Lua, Yurizan Beltran, Shyla Stylez, August Ames.

See also

 AVN Awards
 AVN Award for Male Performer of the Year
 AVN Award for Female Performer of the Year
 AVN Award for Transsexual Performer of the Year
 AVN Award for Male Foreign Performer of the Year
 AVN Award for Female Foreign Performer of the Year
 List of members of the AVN Hall of Fame

References

External links 

 

AVN Awards
2017 film awards
AVN Awards 35